Southcrest is an urban community in the southeastern section of the city of San Diego. It is bordered by Mountain View on the north and east, Interstate 5 and the neighborhoods of Barrio Logan and Logan Heights on the west, and Shelltown on the south. Major thoroughfares include National Avenue and 40th Street.

History
Prior to the 1980s the Southcrest area was part of the neighborhood Shelltown and many residents still consider this area Shelltown. The neighborhood was to have been bifurcated by a planned freeway - California State Route 252 - which would have connected Interstate 805 to Interstate 5. This freeway has been deleted, and a portion of the previous right of way has been developed into the 252 Corridor Park.  Many of the older homes in this area were destroyed in anticipation of the freeway and later replaced with tract housing.  The area was renamed Southcrest shortly after.

Demographics
Southcrest is a diverse neighborhood and home to one of the highest concentrations of Latinos in the City. Current demographics for the neighborhood are as follows: people of Hispanic/Latino heritage make up 89.5%, followed by African-Americans at 4.5%, Asian at 2.4%, non-Hispanic Whites 2.0%,  and Mixed Race at 1.5%. It ranked last out of 125 San Diego neighborhoods in terms of lowest percentage of non-Hispanic whites, and 1 out of 125 San Diego neighborhoods in terms of total population that is non-White (roughly 98.0%).

Landmarks and facilities
A portion of Chollas Creek runs through Southcrest on its way to San Diego Bay. 252 Corridor Park parallels much of the creekbed through the neighborhood. 252 Corridor Park has been renamed Southcrest Trails Park.  San Diego's Southcrest Trails Park is located in Southcrest, within the Chollas Creek floodplain, part of the smallest watershed in San Diego and containing the highest population density. The Park itself is located south of Boston Avenue and west of South 38th Street. The park was scheduled to be completed in December 2012. In the heart of Southcrest lies the first Samoan church of any denomination in the United States. The church started in 1955 at the Naval Base, but didn't build their sanctuary until 1964. The church is located at 1345 South 45th Street.

Government
Southcrest is located within the 9th City Council District, currently represented by Jennifer Campbell. It is part of the Southeastern San Diego Planning Area.

Education
Southcrest is served by the San Diego Unified School District.

References

External links
 City of San Diego neighborhood description 

Neighborhoods in San Diego